Kentucky Route 436 (KY 436) is a  state highway in Hart County, Kentucky. It runs from Kentucky Routes 218 and 570 southeast of Uno to Kentucky Route 88 west of Monroe.

Major intersections

References

0436
Transportation in Hart County, Kentucky